Hicom or HICOM may refer to:

 , a PBX/ISDN telephone system family, including the Hicom 300, by Siemens
  (Heavy Industries Corporation of Malaysia) aka HICOM Holding Berhad
 HICOM Automotive Manufacturers (Malaysia)
 DRB-HICOM, a Malaysian company after the merger of DRB and HICOM

See also
 High Com, an analogue noise reduction system by Telefunken and Nakamichi
 UNSC High Command (HIGHCOM), a fictional UN Space Command in 'Factions of Halo'